is a 2009 Japanese-Korean anime series that began airing in Japan and South Korea as a science-fiction adventure to generate more awareness in chemistry and other sciences. The series is set in the year 2089. A manga series began at the same time, and has continued even after the anime ended in 2010, and the manga still continues until August 2010. Bandai Namco has released a Nintendo DS game for Element Hunters, it was released on October 22, 2009 in Japan and on December 18, 2009 in South Korea. This is the last game to be developed by the now defunct Climax Entertainment. The franchise is closing on officials websites in this time.

Synopsis
In 2029, chemical elements such as oxygen, carbon, gold, molybdenum, and cobalt were continually disappearing from Earth. These disappearing elements ultimately disrupted the environment and led to the destruction of various homes, cities, and even entire countries. Researchers discovered that the vanishing elements drained into a planet called Nega Earth, located in another dimension. In 2089, Element dematerialization was occurring rapidly; thus, to save Earth, three special pre-teens picked by the space colony government formed the Element Hunters. Their job was to transport themselves to Nega-Earth to battle monsters called QEXes and retrieve lost elements. However, out of their own concerns, Ren, Chiara, and Homi, three average middle school students from Earth, banded together to also become Element Hunters. With the help of Professor Aimee Carr and Juno, they are able to help save their own planet.

Characters

Earth Team

 (Japan)
 (Korea)
 Birth date: October 9th
 Age: 12
 An energetic middle-schooler who always looks for exciting adventures. He lacks the patience for learning and prefers to meet challenges head on; however, once he became an Element Hunter, Ren took the time to study chemistry in order to better eliminate QEXes. Ren tends to act before thinking a lot; however, his ingenuity has helped his team win various battles. His parents own a restaurant, and his grandfather had close ties to Professor Aimee Carr. Even though he was elected vice-chairman to help Chiara, he tends to argue with her a lot.

 (Japan)
 (Korea)
 Birth date: April 8th
 Age: 12
 A serious, intelligent, young girl who is best friends with Ren and Homi. Her motto is, "I am the judge and the jury." She transferred to the same town Ren lived in three years prior to the storyline, and because of her dedication, hard work, and independence, she plowed her way up to class chairman. Chiara and Ren both met Homi while helping each other saving Sena, a stray dog, during an episode of element dematerialization. She lives with her father, who is rather laid-back, and usually fulfills household duties. Even though her parents do not live together (but are not divorced), her mother still visits both Chiara and her father and keep in touch. Chiara considers herself the leader of the Earth Team, frequently putting her at odds with Ren. She eventually shows feelings for Rodney.

 (Japan)
  (Korea)
 Birth date: April 10th
 Age: 11
 A bookworm who, up until he meet Ren and Chiara, has always been alone. Though he is not physically healthy due to his cardiac disease, Homi is the smartest team member out of the Element Hunters from Earth and often acts as the team's strategist.  After saving Sena, his dog, he befriends Ren and Chiara. He was actually adopted while he was younger by an elderly couple whom he now calls his grandparents. When Homi was little, he used to catch butterflies with his grandfather before he died. Now, he lives with his grandmother. After meeting Hannah, he finds out that both of them were man-made as a part of a government project. He considers Hannah to be his biological sister.

 (Japan)
  (Korea)
 The former leader of the Colony team. She is from Egypt. Ally sent the Earth Team Booster Wear after acknowledging them as rivals in order to help them defeat more QEXes. During her time as captain of Element Hunters at the colony, she started questioning element dematerialization and the motives of the government. Soon afterwards, a terrible accident happened on Nega Earth that led everyone to believe she was dead. However, she actually survived and left the Element Hunters team in order to join Professor Aimee Carr on Earth.  Chiara bought her clothes as a welcoming present shortly after Ally arrived on Earth. She is terrible at cooking and has made Ren faint from eating her food. Ally considers Juno to be her best friend.

 (Japan)
  (Korea)
 Before her death, Professor Carr had her conscious preserved digitally in order to continue existing as an information-based hologram. She found and convinced Ren (the only person how call her as Old Lady, even if she hates this nickname), Chiara, and Homi to become the Element Hunters from Earth and guides them through their path to saving their planet. Professor Carr becomes annoyed whenever Ren calls her old; she subsequently electrocutes him afterwards. When Professor Carr was five years old, she shouted to the world, "I wish the Earth disappears," which managed to awaken creatures in the 11th dimension and thus caused the birth of the Earth's destruction.

 (Japan)
  (Korea)
 An android who serves as the assistant of Carr. She alerts the Earth Team when the presence of a QEX is detected. Juno often works on improving her human-like behaviors with them. Despite being an android, she dreams and cries. Later in the anime, when all of the Element Hunters are trapped on Nega Earth, Juno is melted along a vast amount of iron so she can appear in Nega Earth and tell the children how to get back home. She is the reason why the Earth Team is able to talk to Shape-Shifters on Nega Earth. At the end of the final episode she is seen smiling as she stands on top of a cliff watching the kids.

Colony Team
The team made up of children who have the ability to go to "Nega Earth." They are taken from Earth early in their lives and trained in the Space Colony to become Element Hunters.

 (Japan)
 (Korea)
 The former leader of the Colony team. She is from Egypt. Ally sent the Earth Team Booster Wear after acknowledging them as rivals in order to help them defeat more QEXes. During her time as captain of Element Hunters at the colony, she started questioning element dematerialization and the motives of the government. Soon afterwards, a terrible accident happened on Nega Earth that led everyone to believe she was dead. However, she actually survived and left the Element Hunters team in order to join Professor Aimee Carr on Earth. Chiara bought her clothes as a welcoming present shortly after Ally arrived on Earth. She is terrible at cooking and has made Ren faint from eating her food. Ally considers Juno to be her best friend.

 (Japan)
  (Korea)
 A serious, handsome, and frequently elitist member of the colony team. He comes from a rich political family, though he is not proud of his connections. Though his father pressures him to leave Element Hunters, Rodney chooses not to and tries to achieve his goals in life without the help of his father. He is upset that Hannah was appointed as their leader after Ally left and tends not trust her. Rodney has strong feelings for Chiara and deeply cares for her. He often opposes Chiara embarking on any type of dangerous activity for fear of her getting hurt.

 (Japan)
  (Korea)
 An aloof member of the colony team who has a quirky sense of humor. Tom was quicker to accept the Earth team among his team members. On Nega-Earth, he collected gems and named them in his spare time. Tom is obsessed with Hannah and was thrilled with Chiara gave him her signed autograph. Though Hannah always treated him with ill manners, he continually tries to befriend her. He worked in the research department at the Space Colony and developed transportation vehicles for use on Nega-Earth.

 (Japan)
  (Korea)
 The newly appointed leader of the Colony team, after Ally left. She is a well-known celebrity and is the face of Mirai Orange. Her catchphrase is, "Smile with Mirai Orange." She is actually rather selfish and enjoys being by herself. Though she highly excelled in her childhood, she was constantly picked on because everybody back then knew that Hannah was created by the government as a tool. She has a foster father who often psychologically manipulated her in order to help him try and destroy Earth so that the colony could move to Mars instead. After she realized that she and Homi have the same shape for ears, they both discover that they are siblings.

Others

 (Japan)
 Ren's father and the owner of the family-run restaurant, Dan Dan. After a head on encounter with elemental deterioration, he falls down a hole and breaks both his legs.

 (Japan)
 Ren's mother. She believes that Ren and Chiara have a mutual attraction towards each other, though they strongly deny it. Ren's biggest fear is his own mother.

 Chiara's dad. He is a carefree man, capable of laughing after losing his job. He shows strong moral courage and is never ashamed of whatever he loves to do. He is frequently seen watching TV episodes of "Element Five" --a TV show in which his wife plays the leading role. He gives advice to Chiara about love; he told her that though he argues with his wife, they still care for each other. His advice helped Chiara accept Rodney's confession.

 Chiara's mother. She takes the lead role in a TV show called "Element Five", a Super Sentai series. She cares deeply for Chiara and looks kindly upon her husband. Despite being separated, they still love each other. Later, she and Hannah star in a new movie together.

 Hannah's foster father. He acts against the Colony's interests of saving the Earth.

Episodes

Staff
Original Story by Kazunori Ito
Directed by Yoshiaki Okumura, Hong Hun-pyo
Writer: Naruhisa Arakawa
Character Design by Daigo Okumura
SF setting by Ryuichi Kaneko
Music by Toshihiko Sahashi
Science supervisor: Masato Murakami
Element Design by Apuo Reino
Art Direction by Bong Ha Gwon (credited as Bong Ha-gwon), Nobuto Sakamoto
Cinematography by Na Se Yun (credited as Na Se-yeon)
Editing by Takeshi Seyama
Sound Direction by Toru Nakano
Music Produced by Keiichi Nozaki
Animation Producer: Shin Ju-hee
Producers: Yasuo Kageyama, Kim Sun-tae
Executive Producer: Akemi Sugayama
Spanish Distributor: Arait Multimedia S.A.
Animation by NHK Enterprises (credited as NHK Enterprise), Heewon Entertainment
©2009 Elementhunters Production Committee

Music
Opening Theme : "First Pain" by Chiaki Ishikawa (Korean Version sung by Seondeok Choi)
Ending Theme : "H-He-Li-Be ~The magical spell~"" by Kakkii and Ash Potato (Korean Version sung by Mijin Kim, Namkyu Won, Taewook Lee and Kyoungwon Ju)

Notes

References

External links
 Official site (Web Archive) 
 Official site in English
 Official KBS Element Hunters website 
 Official NHK Element Hunters website 
 
 

2009 anime television series debuts
2009 manga
2009 video games
2010 Japanese television series endings
2009 South Korean television series debuts
2010 South Korean television series endings
2000s South Korean animated television series
Japanese children's animated adventure television series
Japanese children's animated science fiction television series
South Korean animated television series
South Korean children's animated television series
South Korean children's animated adventure television series
South Korean children's animated science fiction television series
Anime with original screenplays
NHK original programming
Shōnen manga
Shueisha manga
Bandai games
Television series set in 2029
Fiction set in 2029
Fiction set in the 2080s
Television series set in the 2080s
Japanese time travel television series
South Korean time travel television series
Nintendo DS games
Nintendo DS-only games
Video games developed in Japan
Bandai Namco games